Apodemia nais, the nais metalmark, is a species of metalmark in the family of butterflies known as Riodinidae. It is found in North America.

The MONA or Hodges number for Apodemia nais is 4408.

References

Further reading

 

Apodemia
Articles created by Qbugbot
Butterflies described in 1877